Robert Blobaum is an American historian who is the Eberly Professor of History at West Virginia University. In 2018, he was elected president of the Polish Institute of Arts and Sciences of America for the 2018-2021 term, the first scholar of non-Polish origin to attain the post.

Works

References

Living people
Historians of Poland
21st-century American historians
21st-century American male writers
West Virginia University faculty
Year of birth missing (living people)
American male non-fiction writers